En Vivo Desde El Carnegie Hall is a live album by the Puerto Rican Salsa singer Gilberto Santa Rosa, released on October 3, 1995. The Album was recorded live at New York City's Carnegie Hall. This performance marks the first time that a Puerto Rican singer of tropical music to perform at Carnegie Hall. The orchestra was directed by Angel Peña and there was a special appearance by cuatro virtuoso Edwin Colón Zayas.

Track listing

Disc One
"Obertura" – 4:07
"Represento" – 3:23
"Amor Mio No Te Vayas" – 7:31
"Vivir Sin Ella" – 8:32
"Quién lo Diría" – 7:38
"Sin Voluntad" – 6:20
"Cantante de Cartel" – 12:48

Disc Two
"Dime Por Qué" – 5:06
"Conciencia" – 6:50
"Perdóname" – 8:20
"Amanecer Borincano" – 7:16
"Plenas (Medley)" – 4:42

Chart position

Sales and certifications

References

Gilberto Santa Rosa live albums
1995 live albums
Sony Discos live albums
Albums recorded at Carnegie Hall
Spanish-language live albums